The 1999 European Athletics Junior Championships were held in Riga, Latvia on August 5–8.

Men's results

Women's results

Medal table

References
european-athletics - European Athletics
Results - GBR Athletics
Results - GBR Athletics
Historia Europy Juniorów lekkoatletyka -Athletics Poland

European Athletics U20 Championships
European Athletics Junior Championships, 1999
European Athletics Junior Championships, 1999
European Athletics Junior Championships, 1999
European Athletics Junior Championships, 1999
European Athletics Junior Championships, 1999